Kingseat Hospital was a psychiatric hospital that is considered to be one of New Zealand's notorious haunted locations with over one hundred claims of apparitions being reported, . It is located in Karaka, New Zealand, south of Auckland and since 2005 has been used as a site for Spookers; and since 2013 a site for Asylum Paintball and Laser Combat; three New Zealand attractions. Spookers is believed to be Australasia's only haunted attraction scream park , and "the number 1 Haunted Attraction in the Southern Hemisphere". According to stuff.co.nz, Kingseat Hospital is considered one of the most haunted locations in New Zealand.

Origin and name 
The psychiatric hospital was built in Karaka from 1929. The construction began when twenty patients from a nearby mental institution came to the site along with twelve wheelbarrows and ten shovels. Dr. Henry Bennett was originally the former owner of Kingseat hospital in the 1950s. Kingseat Hospital was named after a hospital in Aberdeenshire, Scotland following Dr. Gray (the Director-General of the Mental Health Division of the Health Department at the time) returning from an overseas trip, who felt it appropriate to have a sister hospital with the same name in New Zealand. Flower gardens, shrubs and trees were grown in the grounds of Kingseat Hospital such as surplus plants from the Ellerslie Racecourse and Norfolk Island pines originally seeds from Sir George Grey's garden on Kawau Island.

Operation history 

Kingseat Hospital was in operation from 1932. In 1939, the Public Works Department and Fletcher Construction Company, Ltd. agreed on the construction of a two-storey nurses home at Kingseat Hospital, with the government to provide the steel for the building. The hospital grew throughout the mid-late 1930s and 1940s to such an extent that by the beginning of 1947, there were over eight hundred patients. During the 1950s, Dr. Henry Bennett (the man whom the mental health wing at Waikato Hospital is named after) was a senior medical officer of health at Kingseat Hospital.
From 1964, nursing staff at Kingseat were given name tags to wear on their uniforms. In 1968, certain nurses at Kingseat Hospital went on strike, which forced the administration to invite unemployed people and volunteers to assist within the hospital grounds with domestic chores. In 1973, a therapeutic pool was opened by the then-Mayoress of Auckland, Mrs. Barbara Goodman, four years before the main swimming pool was added to the hospital in 1977. The site celebrated its 50th anniversary jubilee in 1982. During the 1970s and 1980s, there were many places attached to psychiatric hospitals in New Zealand where alcoholics were treated for their drinking addictions and Villas 4 and 11 at Kingseat Hospital served this purpose. In later years, the hospital accepted voluntary patients. In 1996, South Auckland Health sold Kingseat Hospital after government decisions to replace ongoing hospitalisation of mentally ill patients with community care and rehabilitation units. This led to the eventual closure of Kingseat Hospital in July 1999, when the final patients were re-located off the complex to a mental health unit in Otara.

Post-hospital use 
After the closure of Kingseat Hospital in 1999, the grounds were initially considered as a potential site for a new prison, able to accommodate for six hundred inmates. In 2000, legal action was taken against the Tainui tribe for financial issues involving the former hospital. By 2004, more than two-hundred people had come forward to file complaints against the national government for claims of mistreatment and abuse of patients at New Zealand's psychiatric institutions (including Kingseat Hospital) during the 1960s and 1970s. In 2005, a television episode of Ghost Hunt featured the site of the former hospital. , the most common apparition reportedly seen at Kingseat Hospital was the "Grey Nurse", believed to be a former staff member, in and around the former nurses' home. In 2009, the owning company of the former hospital claimed it would proceed with plans to disconnect the water supply of residents within the local region, leaving many to either pay large fees for a different supply or to install new water tanks. By that year, the Freaky Forest of Fear, and CornEvil had been offered as on-site attractions.

In 2011, ideas were proposed to grow the area in the Kingseat suburb tenfold for the area's equine industry. This involved propositions of rezoning to residential a majority of the land around Kingseat Hospital although certain buildings, structures and plant life on the former hospital site were protected due to historic and cultural value. In 2013, a property developer revealed a plan to transform the site of the hospital into a countryside living estate with four hundred and fifty homes. The plan sparked debate over which buildings and their park-like surroundings should stay as a reminder of its past, with the New Zealand Historic Places Trust requesting better protection of heritage values of buildings and plants. But some residents insisted that the complex represented a sad past and shouldn't be highlighted as heritage. That same year, Haunted Auckland conducted a paranormal investigation at the site. In the following two years, Haunted Auckland conducted a further ten research visits within various buildings at Kingseat; including the notorious Maximum Security Wing. The promo for the 2014 season of local television show Shortland Street was partly filmed at Kingseat Hospital as was a music video for I Am Giant.

Spookers
Spookers is reportedly New Zealand's largest operator in haunted horror entertainment. In 2005, the haunted attraction Spookers opened in the area of the former hospital in the former nurse hostel. Many of the special effects at Spookers were created with assistance from Weta Workshop. Spookers hold annual O'Scares Awards at the old Kingseat Hospital. In 2007, Spookers received three Stevenson Franklin Country Business Awards nominations.

In 2010, New Zealand filmmaker Dale Stewart shot his horror film Compound at the former hospital property after receiving permission from Spookers, the current owners. Spookers were finalists of the year's Tourism Industry Awards. Spookers also won the Contribution to the Community Award for its staff's contribution to raising money for Ronald McDonald House at the 2010 Westpac Manukau Business Excellence Awards. In late 2011, Spookers opened the Amazing Maze n' Maize.

An obstacle race involving zombie attacks and known as "Run for your Freak'n Life" was held by Spookers on 15 April 2012, in a "Fun Run" in celebration of being open for 6 years, 6 months, and 6 days on that date. The three quantities of 6 (years, months, days) are a reference to 666, the Number of the Beast. Later that year, a billboard for Spookers, advertising the theme park in Parnell, Auckland was reported to the Advertising Standards Authority after complaint that it could be seen by children who were not the target market, but could be frightened by the advertisement. It was claimed by Spookers to be the first ever complaint regarding advertising in its seven years of production. In October 2012, Spookers (which is open every Friday and Saturday night in addition to each Halloween), offered a bus to accommodate visitor transport for the occasion. In 2013, Spookers was named as one of "10 Awesome Auckland Attractions". In April 2014, the Haunted Auckland team requested former workers to share their experiences. In May 2014, Spookers made plans to open in Queensland, Australia.

A 2017 namesake documentary about the attraction was directed by Florian Habicht. In Australia, the documentary Spookers aired on SBS Viceland and SBS on Demand.

In 2018, Spookers was put up for sale.

In 2019, it was announced that Spookers would host a Halloween event called "Seven Deadly Sins".

Dutch elm disease outbreak 
In July 2013, there was a record outbreak of Dutch elm disease in two hundred trees at the site of the former hospital.

References

External links 
 Spookers Haunted Attraction. Retrieved December 2011
 Asylum Paintball. Retrieved December 2013
 Haunted Auckland. Retrieved March 2014

Hospital buildings completed in 1932
Psychiatric hospitals in New Zealand
Tourist attractions in the Auckland Region
Tourist attractions in Auckland
Haunted attractions (simulated)
Reportedly haunted locations in New Zealand
Hospitals established in 1932
Organizations disestablished in 1999
Event venues established in 2005
Buildings and structures in the Auckland Region
Halloween events
Defunct hospitals in New Zealand
Paintball
1930s architecture in New Zealand